The National Museum of Somalia (Mathaf Watani lil-Sumal) is a national museum in Mogadishu, the capital of Somalia. It was established in 1933 by the colonial authorities in Italian Somaliland. After shutting down operations in 1991, it later reopened, and presently houses a number of important historical artefacts. In September 2019, the museum was rebuilt; almost 30 years after its destruction.

Old Garesa Museum

The National Museum of Somalia is housed in a two-storey building that dates back to 1872. It was built at the request of the Omani Sultan of Zanzibar, Barghash ibn Sa'id, as a residence (called Garesa) for the then Governor of Mogadishu, Suleiman bin Hamed, after he had received permission from the Somali Sultan Ahmed Yusuf of the Geledi Sultanate.

In 1933, the building was totally reconstructed and adapted to the Somalia Museum. It was the most important cultural place in Italian Mogadiscio.

The "Museo della Garesa" (as was called by the Italian colonists) was officially opened to the public the next year by Governor Maurizio Rava. The museum suffered heavy damages during World War II.

After the independence of Somalia in 1960 it was turned into a National Museum. When the National Museum was moved in 1985 it was renamed to the old Garesa Museum and converted to a regional museum.

National Museum

In 1985, the Mogadishu cultural center opened. The center the consisted of the National Theater, National Library and the National Museum. The National Museum's architecture shows Islamic influences and consists of a main building with four exhibition floors. To the north is a rectangular four storied building where technical and administrative offices where located. The director-general on the opening of the museum was Ahmed Farah Warsame.

Exhibitions
The exhibition rooms were opened in May 1987.
Ground floor: Archaeological and Ethnolographical Exhibitions.
First floor: Historical Exhibition: Colonial Resistance and Post-Independence.
Second floor: Historical Arms and, modern Army Exhibitions, Language and Literature.
Third floor: Temporary Exhibits.

Closure
Following the start of the civil war in 1991, the museum closed down. Its infrastructure incurred significant damage in the ensuing years.

New National Museum
The National Museum subsequently reopened. As of January 2014, it holds many culturally important artefacts. Among these are old coins, bartering tools, traditional artwork, ancient weaponry and pottery items.

See also
 Mogadishu
 List of museums in Somalia

References

External links
Museums in Somalia - National Museum in Mogadishu

Houses completed in 1872
Italian Somaliland
Buildings and structures in Mogadishu
Museums established in 1933
Museums in Somalia
Somalia